John Lockwood Wilson (August 7, 1850November 6, 1912) was an American lawyer and politician from the U.S. states of Indiana and Washington. He served in the U.S. House of Representatives (1889–1895) and U.S. Senate (1895–1899)

Biography
Wilson was born in Crawfordsville, Indiana, the son of James Wilson, a U.S. Representative, and his wife, Emma (Ingersoll) Wilson, and was the elder brother of Henry Lane Wilson. He attended the common schools and was a messenger during the American Civil War. Wilson received his Bachelor of Arts degree from Wabash College in 1874. Wilson's degree was subsequently upgraded to Master of Arts, and in 1907 Wabash College awarded Wilson the honorary degree of LL.D. After college he studied law, being admitted to the bar in 1878. He commenced practice in Crawfordsville and in 1880 was elected to the Indiana House of Representatives. He was appointed by President Chester A. Arthur as receiver of public moneys at Spokane Falls and Colfax in Washington Territory, serving in this position from 1882 to 1887.

Upon the admission of Washington into the Union, Wilson was elected as a Republican in the 1888 elections to the House of Representatives as the representative from Washington's at-large congressional district for the 51st United States Congress. Wilson was re-elected in 1890 and 1892 to the 52nd and 53rd Congresses, serving from November 20, 1889, to February 18, 1895, when he resigned to become a Senator.

Wilson was elected as a Republican to the Senate on February 1, 1895, to fill the vacancy in the term commencing March 4, 1893, but did not assume his senatorial duties until February 19, 1895. He lost his bid for reelection to Addison G. Foster in 1898 and left office on March 3, 1899.  While in the Senate, Wilson was chairman of the Committee on Indian Depredations during the 54th and 55th Congresses.

After leaving the Senate, Wilson published the Seattle Post-Intelligencer. He died in Washington, D.C., in 1912 and was interred in Oak Hill Cemetery in Crawfordsville.

References

1850 births
1912 deaths
Republican Party members of the Indiana House of Representatives
Wabash College alumni
Republican Party United States senators from Washington (state)
Republican Party members of the United States House of Representatives from Washington (state)
19th-century American politicians
19th-century American lawyers
20th-century American lawyers